John H. Wilson was an Arizona politician who served as a member of the Arizona House of Representatives during the 19th Arizona State Legislature (1949-1950).

References

Democratic Party members of the Arizona House of Representatives